A systematic investment plan (SIP) is an investment vehicle offered by many mutual funds to investors, allowing them to invest small amounts periodically instead of lump sums. The frequency of investment is usually weekly, monthly or quarterly.

Overview
In SIPs, a fixed amount of money is debited by the investors in bank accounts periodically and invested in a specified mutual fund. The investor is allocated a number of units according to the current Net asset value. Every time a sum is invested, more units are added to the investors account.

The strategy claims to free the investors from speculating in volatile markets by dollar cost averaging. As the investor is getting more units when the price is low and fewer units when the price is high, in the long run, the average cost per unit is supposed to be lower.

SIP claims to encourage disciplined investment. SIPs are flexible; the investors may stop investing a plan anytime or may choose to increase or decrease the investment amount. SIP is usually recommended to retail investors who do not have the resources to pursue the active investment.

See also
 Recurring deposit
 Dollar cost averaging

References 

Investment funds